Sambal is an Indonesian hot sauce. This may also refer to:
Sambar (dish), Indian dish
Sambal people, Philippine ethnolinguistic group
Sambalic languages, languages of the Sambal people
Sambal (drum), Indian percussion instrument